Gran Premio dell'Insubria-Lugano was a single day race in the historic region of Insubria, Switzerland. The race was established in 2009 as a 1.1 event on the UCI Europe Tour. The race replaced the former Gran Premio di Chiasso, but was not held after 2011.

Past winners

References

Recurring sporting events established in 2009
2009 establishments in Switzerland
UCI Europe Tour races
Cycle races in Switzerland
Defunct cycling races in Switzerland